Thomas Meggle (born 22 February 1975) is a German former professional footballer who played as a midfielder. He is on the board of directors at Scottish club Dunfermline Athletic.

Club career
Meggle made his debut on the professional league level in the 2. Bundesliga for FC St. Pauli on 27 July 1997 when he started in a game against Greuther Fürth. He retired at the end of the 2009–10 season.

Post-playing career
On 3 September 2014, Meggle became the head coach of FC St. Pauli replacing Roland Vrabec. He was replaced on 16 December 2014 and became sporting director.

He became part the board of directors at Scottish club Dunfermline Athletic in July 2021.

References

1975 births
Living people
Footballers from Munich
German footballers
Association football midfielders
Bundesliga players
2. Bundesliga players
TSV Schwaben Augsburg players
FC St. Pauli players
TSV 1860 Munich players
FC Hansa Rostock players
German football managers
FC St. Pauli managers